Vaibhav Mangle is a Marathi actor and Hindi film, television and stage actor, noted for his comic roles in Marathi theatre and Marathi films and television from India. Anand Ingle and Vaibhav Mangle are seen playing BL Pathak in Zee Marathi's TV series Shejari Shejari Pakke Shejari.

Television
He is well known for his skits in Fu Bai Fu, a Marathi standup comedy TV show on Zee Marathi. He also plays the main role, along with Anand Ingle, in the comedy show Shejari Shejari Pakke Shejari. It was also aired on Zee Marathi. In this serial, he plays the character of Brijlal Pathak, also known as Birju. Also working in Shirdi Ke Saibaba, on Sony.

 Ek Gaav Bhutacha
 Malwani Days
 Majhe Pati Saubhagyawati
 Shejari Shejari Pakke Shejari
 Fu Bai Fu

Filmography
His movies include Harishchandrachi Factory, Kaksparsh, Shikshanachya Aaicha Gho,Navra Maza Navsacha, Shahanpan Dega Deva, Fakta Ladh Mhana, Shala, Touring Talkies, Timepass are some of the successful movies in which he played an important role.

Following table shows list of films

Drama
He played the main role in the Marathi play Ek Daav Bhatacha. He was also part of famous Marathi play Mukkam Post Bombilwadi.

He played one of the lead roles in Albattya Galbattya and Iblis.

References

External links

Marathi Comedy Videos

Indian male film actors
Male actors in Marathi cinema
Living people
Male actors in Marathi theatre
Marathi actors
1975 births
Male actors in Marathi television